Ilya Moskalenchik (born 4 May 2003) is a Belarusian professional footballer who plays for Russian club Zenit-2 Saint Petersburg.

Club career
On 13 March 2022, Moskalenchik signed a contract until the end of the 2024–25 season with Russian champions Zenit Saint Petersburg and was assigned to the farm club Zenit-2.

References

External links 
 
 

2003 births
People from Minsk District
Sportspeople from Minsk Region
Living people
Belarusian footballers
Belarus youth international footballers
Association football forwards
FC Rukh Brest players
FC Dynamo Brest players
FC Zenit-2 Saint Petersburg players
Belarusian Premier League players
Russian Second League players
Belarusian expatriate footballers
Expatriate footballers in Russia
Belarusian expatriate sportspeople in Russia